Lee School can refer to:

 Lee School (Leesburg, Florida)
 Lee School (Montour, New York)
 Lee Elementary School (Canby, Oregon)
 Robert E. Lee Elementary Magnet School of World Studies & Technology, Tampa, Florida
 Russell Lee Elementary School - Austin Independent School District

See also
 Robert E. Lee Elementary School (disambiguation)
 Robert E. Lee High School
 Lee High School (disambiguation)
 Lee County School District (disambiguation)